Astartea muricata, commonly known as inland astartea, is a shrub endemic to Western Australia.

Description
It blooms between October and November producing white-pink flowers.

Distribution
It is found on seasonally wet flats and river flats in the Wheatbelt region of Western Australia where it grows in sandy-clay soils.

References

Eudicots of Western Australia
muricata
Endemic flora of Western Australia
Plants described in 1852
Taxa named by Nikolai Turczaninow